Roberto Cassinelli (born 10 December 1956) is an Italian politician and lawyer, Member of the Italian Chamber of Deputies.

Studies and professional life
Cassinelli  was born in Genoa, and attended the catholic college Vittorino da Feltre in the same city. Then he graduated in law at University of Milan.He works as a lawyer, pleading at the Supreme Court of Cassation and he has been a member of the bar association at Genoa court of justice.

He is legal consultant and assistant of Italian and European leading banks, industrial and commercial groups, service companies and public authorities.

He is, and has been, director, auditor, judicial and extraordinary commissary in several companies.

Political life
Cassinelli joined very young the Italian Liberal Party (PLI), of which his father, Giorgio, was National vice president.

With PLI he was elected at the Genoa town council, in 1981, 1985 and 1990.

As one of the founders of the political movement Forza Italia in Liguria, he was Regional Vice Secretary from 1994 to 2006, and Genoese Town Commissioner from 2005 and 2007.

The 2007 Forza Italia congress elected him Genoese Town Secretary.

At the 2008 general elections he has been elected at the Chamber of Deputies with the new political movement People of Freedom (Il Popolo della Libertà, Pdl), in which Forza Italia and National Alliance (Alleanza Nazionale, AN) met under the leadership of Silvio Berlusconi.

He is a member of the Commission of Justice at the Chamber of Deputies.

His activity as a Member of Parliament principally focuses on Justice, It law and net neutrality, self-employment.

He is one of the founders of the "Intergruppo Parlamentare 2.0" (Parliamentary Group 2.0), whose aim is to introduce the innovation themes into the Italian Parliament.

He is the head of the National Department on commercial and bankruptcy law for People of Freedom.

External links
Roberto Cassinelli's political website
Roberto Cassinelli's page at Chamber of Deputies website

1956 births
Living people
Politicians from Genoa
The People of Freedom politicians
21st-century Italian politicians
Forza Italia politicians
Italian Liberal Party politicians
20th-century Italian politicians
University of Milan alumni